SSEAL may refer to:
 Swiss Laboratory Animal Science Association, see Life Sciences Switzerland
 South-Southeast Asia Library of the University of California, Berkeley Libraries (Berkeley, California)